Deep Water Bay is a bay and residential area on the southern shore of Hong Kong Island in Hong Kong. The bay is surrounded by Shouson Hill, Brick Hill, Violet Hill and Middle Island. As per Forbes (July 2015), with 19 of the city's richest billionaires, it is reputed to be the "wealthiest neighborhood on earth".

Beneath the hill of Violet Hill is a beach, Deep Water Bay Beach. The bay is reachable by Island Road, a road connecting Repulse Bay and Wong Chuk Hang.

Deep Water Bay is the landing point for SEA-ME-WE 3, TGN-IA and TVH submarine telecommunications cables.

History
Originally, the bay was called Heong Kong Bay as shown in a British map from 1841. A village with the name Heong Kong lay to its north in what is now Shouson Hill, which can still be seen in a map from 1845 when the bay was already known under the name Deep Water Bay. 

At the time of the 1911 census, the population of Deep Water Bay was 8.

Deep Water Bay Beach

Less known to tourists than the adjacent Repulse Bay, Deep Water Bay Beach is nonetheless very popular among local people. Seaview Promenade, on the east side of Deep Water Bay, connects it with Repulse Bay, the path allows joggers and walkers alike to exercise alongside the seashore while admiring the stunning sea view, while Mills & Chung Path connects Deep Water Bay with Wong Chuk Hang on the west side.

Changing rooms, shower facilities and barbecue pits are available under the management of the Leisure and Cultural Services Department.

Deep Water Bay residential Area

Deep Water Bay is among the most exclusive residential areas of Hong Kong as per Forbes and Forbes Life. Nineteen of the city's richest billionaires live here, with a net aggregate worth of $123 billion (as of August 2015). Its residents include property, casino, shipping and oil tycoons including Li Ka Shing, Chen Yu Tong, Joseph Lau, Robert Kuok and Lui Che Woo. All of the Kwok brothers live here and so does the e-commerce tycoon Joseph Tsai.

Education
Deep Water Bay is in Primary One Admission (POA) School Net 18. Within the school net are multiple aided schools (operated independently but funded with government money) and Hong Kong Southern District Government
Primary School.

Conservation
Deep Water Bay Valley was designated a Site of Special Scientific Interest in 2008.

Transportation
Buses No. 6A, 6X or 260 from Central's Exchange Square, 65 from North Point Ferry, 73 from Cyberport & Aberdeen, 973 from Tsim Sha Tsui and green minibuses 40 and 52 have stops at Deep Water Bay.

See also
 HMS Tern (1927)

References

Bays of Hong Kong
Southern District, Hong Kong